"Double Barrel" is a 1970 reggae single by Dave and Ansell Collins (though credited in both the UK and the U.S. to 'Dave and Ansil Collins').  
It was the second reggae tune to top the UK charts, two years after Desmond Dekker's number 1 breakthrough hit "Israelites".  The record reached number 1 on the UK Singles Chart for the first two weeks in May 1971, selling 300,000 copies, after only 33 radio plays. In the U.S., "Double Barrel" peaked at number 22 on the Billboard Hot 100 on 7 August 1971 and number 4 on WLS on 28 June 1971, two years to the week after "Israelites" made a nearly identical climb to peak at the same position on the same chart.  The record also reached number 1 in Mexico on October 23, 1971 and number 8 in Australia.

Background
Written and produced by Winston Riley, former vocalist of The Techniques, the single featured the vocals of Dave Barker, who had been recording in Jamaica for around five years, principally for Clement "Coxsone" Dodd and Lee Perry.  This song marked the first appearance on record by Sly Dunbar, later of Sly & Robbie fame, on drums.  He was just 18 at the time.  A significant portion of the tune bears a strong resemblance to Ramsey Lewis' 1967 song "Party Time" (on Chess).  From the very beginning of the cold intro, the lyrics are punctuated throughout by the unusual claim "I am the magnificent W-O-O-O" (and variants thereof), but the title never appears.

Charts

Cover versions
The song has been covered by later ska acts such as The Selecter and The Specials. In 1972, a sample of the song was included in the top ten hit "Convention '72" by The Delegates. 
In 1971 the song has been covered in Spanish by the mexican singer Rosario. It was called Doble Barril.

Samples
It was sampled in 2012 GOOD Music song "The One".

See also
List of number-one hits of 1971 (Mexico)

References

1970 debut singles
1970 songs
Number-one singles in Mexico
Reggae songs
UK Singles Chart number-one singles